Mabamba Bay is a wetland on the edge of Lake Victoria, northwest of the Entebbe peninsula.

Conservation
Mabamba is one of Uganda's 33 Important Bird Areas and since 2006 a Ramsar-listed wetland of international importance. Key protected bird species in Mabamba are the shoebill, the blue swallow and the papyrus gonolek.

References

Ramsar sites in Uganda
Important Bird Areas of Uganda